The women's 100 metres hurdles event at the 1973 Summer Universiade was held at the Central Lenin Stadium in Moscow on 18, 19 and 20 August.

Medalists

Results

Heats
Wind:Heat 1: -0.2 m/s, Heat 5: +1.0 m/s

Semifinals

Wind:Heat 1: +0.1 m/s, Heat 2: -0.9 m/s

Final

Wind: +0.6 m/s

References

Athletics at the 1973 Summer Universiade
1973